Melvin Andrew Aull (December 23, 1928 – October 12, 2019) was a Canadian football player who played for the Hamilton Tiger-Cats, Ottawa Rough Riders and Saskatchewan Roughriders. He won the Grey Cup with the Rough Riders in 1951.

Aull was born in Hamilton, Ontario and played junior football with the Junior Hamilton Tigers. He was notable for being the only deaf player in Canadian football during his playing years. He lost his hearing at the age of 13 in 1942 after he contracted spinal meningitis after going swimming at a local pool. He practiced lipreading in absence of his hearing and was able to talk normally. He died in Mississauga, Ontario on October 12, 2019.

References

1928 births
2019 deaths
Sportspeople from Hamilton, Ontario
Players of Canadian football from Ontario
Ottawa Rough Riders players
Saskatchewan Roughriders players
Hamilton Tiger-Cats players